Memorex Corp. began as a computer tape producer and expanded to become both a consumer media supplier and a major IBM plug compatible peripheral supplier.  It was broken up and ceased to exist after 1996 other than as a consumer electronics brand specializing in disk recordable media for CD and DVD drives, flash memory, computer accessories and other electronics.

History and evolution 
 
Established in 1961 in Silicon Valley, Memorex started by selling computer tapes, then added other media such as disk packs. The company then expanded into disk drives and other peripheral equipment for IBM mainframes. During the 1970s and into the early 1980s, Memorex was worldwide one of the largest independent suppliers of disk drives and communications controllers to users of IBM-compatible mainframes, as well as media for computer uses and consumers. The company's name is a portmanteau of "memory excellence".

Memorex entered the consumer media business in 1971 and started the ad campaign, first with its "shattering glass" advertisements and then with a series of legendary television commercials featuring Ella Fitzgerald. In the commercials, she would sing a note that shattered a glass while being recorded to a Memorex audio cassette. The tape was played back and the recording also broke the glass, asking "Is it live, or is it Memorex?" This would become the company slogan which was used in a series of advertisements released through 1970s and 1980s.

In 1982, Memorex was bought by Burroughs for its enterprise businesses; the company’s consumer business, a small segment of the company’s revenue at that time was sold to Tandy. Over the next six years, Burroughs and its successor Unisys shut down, sold off or spun out the various remaining parts of Memorex.

The computer media, communications and IBM end user sales and service organization were spun out as Memorex International. In 1988, Memorex International acquired the Telex Corporation becoming Memorex Telex NV, a corporation based in the Netherlands, which survived as an entity until the middle 1990s. The company evolved into a provider of information technology solutions including the distribution and integration of data network and storage products and the provision of related services in 18 countries worldwide. As late as 2006, several pieces existed as subsidiaries of other companies, see e.g., Memorex Telex Japan Ltd a subsidiary of Kanematsu or Memorex Telex (UK) Ltd. a subsidiary of EDS Global Field Services.

Over time the Memorex consumer brand has been owned by Tandy, Handy Holdings and Imation. As of 2016, the Memorex brand is owned by Digital Products International (DPI).

Timeline
1961 – Memorex is founded by Laurence L. Spitters, Arnold T. Challman, Donald F. Eldridge and W Lawrence Noon with Spitters as president.
1962 – Memorex is one of the early independent companies to ship computer tape.
May 1965 – Memorex IPO's at $25 and closes at $32.
1966 – Memorex is first independent company to ship a disk pack.
Jun 1968 – Memorex is first to ship an IBM-plug-compatible disk drive
1970 – Memorex ships 1270 Communications Controller
1971 – With CBS Memorex forms CMX Systems, a company formed to design videotape editing systems
Sep 1971 – Memorex launches its consumer tape business
1972 – Memorex launches its "Is it live, or is it Memorex?" campaign
Apr 1981 – Burroughs acquires Memorex
Apr 1982 – Burroughs sells Memorex consumer brand to Tandy
May 1985 – Burroughs exits OEM disk drive business, selling sales and service to Toshiba
Sep 1986 – Burroughs acquires Sperry and renames itself as Unisys
Dec 1986 – Unisys spins off Memorex Media, Telecommunications and International businesses as Memorex International NV.
Jan 1988 – Memorex-Telex merger
Dec 1988 – Unisys mainly shuts down large disk business and spins off service and repair as Sequel.
Nov 1993 – Tandy sells Memorex consumer brand to Hanny Holdings of Hong Kong
Oct 1996 – The U.S. operations of Memorex Telex NV filed for bankruptcy and with court approval were sold November 1, 1996.
Jan 2006 – Imation acquires Memorex brand for $330 million.
Jan 2016 – Imation closed on the sale of its Memorex trademark and two associated trademark licenses to DPI Inc., a St. Louis-based branded consumer electronics company for $9.4 million.

References

External links
 Memorex brand site
 Memorex History at Computer History Museum website

1961 establishments in California
American brands
American companies established in 1961
American companies disestablished in 1996
Computer companies established in 1961
Computer companies disestablished in 1996
Defunct computer companies based in California
Defunct computer companies of the United States
Defunct computer hardware companies
Computer storage companies
Electronics companies established in 1961
Electronics companies disestablished in 1996
Electronics companies of the United States
Technology companies established in 1961
Technology companies disestablished in 1996
RadioShack